Oraalppokkam is a Malayalam film written and directed by Sanalkumar Sasidharan. It is the first Malayalam movie which has been produced through online crowdfunding program. This is an initiative of Kazhcha Chalachithra Vedi, a film society movement based in Thiruvananthapuram. Kazhcha has a history of producing short movies with the  financial contribution from film lovers. Oraalppokkam is the fourth venture of Kazhcha. It is claimed that Oraalppokkam will be copyleft after 5 years from the date of release.

Synopsis
The storyline of the movie revolves round an honest man-woman relationship in the backdrop of a natural calamity. Mahendran and Maya are in a relationship. They have their own independent lives even while they are living as a couple. Slowly the relationship ends up in a usual pattern and Mahendran the protagonist decides to separate. Maya leaves him and disappears without revealing her whereabouts. But the separation which is more or less forced and unnatural causes imbalance in the life of Mahendran. His curiosity to know the whereabouts of Maya mounts slowly and he starts a journey in search of her. At the end of the journey he reaches the flood affected Himalayan mountain valley Kedarnath. The story develops through the people he meets on the way and his dreams.

Cast 
 Prakash Bare 
 Meena Kandasamy
 Sonia Kohli
 Bikramjit Gupta
 Chala Chari
 Tarique Hameed
 Venkitesh Ramakrishnan
 Swami Samvidanand

Production 
Oraalppokkam is scripted and directed by Sanalkumar Sasidharan. This will be the debut feature film of Sanal, an independent film maker from Thiruvananthapuram. The cast including actor-producer Prakash Bare, writer Meena Kandasamy, Bengali director Bikramjit Gupta, senior journalist Venkatesh Ramakrishnan and theatre and film artiste Krishnan Balakrishnan. Indrajith S handles the cinematography and Appu N. Bhattathiri is the editor. Murugan is  handling the production design. T Krishnanunni is the sound designer while Sandeep Kurissery and Jiji P Joseph are the location sound recordists. Basil Joseph is the music director and Derrick Sebastian is the executive producer of this project.

Awards
 2014 Kerala State Film Awards

 Best Director - Sanal Kumar Sasidharan
 Best Location Sound Recording - Sandeep Kurissery and Jiji P Joseph

Other Awards

 NETPAC award for the best Malayalam film in the 19th IFFK
 FIPRESCI award for the best Malayalam film in the 19th IFFK
 Special Jury Award for the best director in John Abraham Award 2014
 Special Jury Mention for the best debut director in the Aravindan Puraskaram 2014

References

External links
 
 Review in Hollywood reporter

2010s Malayalam-language films
Indian independent films
Films shot in Thiruvananthapuram
Films directed by Sanal Kumar Sasidharan